Lyric Records was a Germany based record label marketing gramophone records to the British market prior to World War I. The pressings were manufactured by Kalliope Records using masters from other German-based labels recording British material, including Polyphon and  principally Favorite.

See also
 List of record labels
 Lyric Records (US)

References
1 Don Taylor, The English 78 Picture Book (Artemis Publishing

Defunct record labels of Germany